A highway is a long road giving a relatively fast connection between two places.

Highway may also refer to:

Roads in England 

 The Highway (London) (previously Ratcliff Highway), a road in the East End of London 
 The Highway, a road in Bromley, Greater London (BR6)
 The Highway, a road in Harrow, London (HA7)
 The Highway, a road in the London Borough of Sutton (SM2)
 The Highway, a road in Eastcotts, Bedford, Bedfordshire (MK42)

Other placenames in England 

 Highway, Berkshire
 Highway, Cornwall
 Highway, Somerset
 Highway, Wiltshire

Music 
Highway (Australian band)
Highway (Montenegrin band)
Highway (America album), 1970
Highway (Free album), 1970
Highway (Sean Delaney album), 1979
Highway (The Wilkinsons album), 2005
Highway (soundtrack), a soundtrack album from the 2014 Hindi film (see below)
 The Highway (Sirius XM), a country music satellite radio station
 The Highway (album), a Holly Williams album
 "Highway", a song by The Moody Blues, previously unreleased prior to the compilation album Time Traveller
 "Highway", a song by twlv from Antiformal
 "Highway", a song by Fat Mattress from Fat Mattress II

Films, TV series and plays
Highway (1995 film), an Indian Malayalam-language film
Highway (2002 film), a film starring Jared Leto and Jake Gyllenhaal
Highway (2012 American film), a film directed by Coke Daniels
Highway (2012 Nepali film), a Nepali drama film directed by Deepak Rauniyar
Highway (2014 Bengali film), an Indian Bengali-language film
Highway (2014 Hindi film), an Indian Hindi-language film
Highway (2015 film), an Indian Marathi-language film
Highway (2022 film), an Indian Telugu-language film
The Highway, alternate title of the 1934 Chinese silent film The Big Road
Highway (TV series), religious-orientated UK television series from 1983 to 1993
Highway (play), 1944 play by Sophie Treadwell
Dave E. "Highway" Harlson, a character from COPS (animated TV series)
 She's Missing, an upcoming film directed by Alexandra McGuinness originally titled Highway

People
 René Highway (1954–1990), Native Canadian dancer
 Tomson Highway (born 1951), Native Canadian playwright

See also
 Heighway, a surname